Suhi Dol may refer to:
 Suhi Dol (Surdulica), a village in the municipality of Surdulica, Serbia
 , a village in the municipality of Travnik, Bosnia and Herzegovina

See also 
 Suvi Dol, a village in the city of Vranje, Serbia
 Suvi Do (disambiguation), several villages in Serbia and Kosovo
 Suhindol, a town in Bulgaria
 Suhodol (disambiguation)
 Suvodol (disambiguation)